Limonium bourgeaui is a species of flowering plant in the family Plumbaginaceae, native to Lanzarote and Fuerteventura in the Canary Islands. A herbaceous perennial and subshrub, it is morphologically similar to but genetically distinct from Limonium puberulum.

References

bourgeaui
Halophytes
Endemic flora of the Canary Islands
Flora of Lanzarote
Plants described in 1891